Joshua Jacob Keur (born September 4, 1976) is a former American football tight end who played for the Indianapolis Colts of the National Football League (NFL). He played college football at Michigan State University.

References 

1976 births
Living people
People from Muskegon, Michigan
Players of American football from Michigan
American football tight ends
Michigan State Spartans football players
Indianapolis Colts players